IntraFi Network (Formerly Promontory Interfinancial Network), LLC, is a privately held firm with a network of financial institutions that has approximately one-third of all U.S. commercial banks and thrifts as members. The company is located in Arlington, Virginia.

History
The company was founded by a number of former federal banking regulators and BNY Mellon provides issuance, custody, settlement, and recordkeeping services for IntraFi. IntraFi was included in the Washington Post's list of Top Workplaces 2018. The company was also ranked first as the best place to work for in fintech by American Banker, in 2018 and 2021.

The Cofounder and CEO of the company is Mark Jacobsen, a former chief of staff of the Federal Deposit Insurance Corporation (FDIC) and inventor of 13 patents related to IntraFi's FDIC-insured deposit placement services. 
The company changed its name to IntraFi Network in 2020.

Products
IntraFi offers FDIC-insured deposit placement services, including IntraFi Network Deposits and IntraFi Funding. These services combined the company's former offerings: Certificate of Deposit Account Registry Service, or CDARS; Insured Cash Sweep service, or ICS; and the Insured Network Deposits service, or IND. IntraFi also publishes a quarterly business outlook survey of banks. IntraFi's services help bank depositors to access FDIC insurance above the $250,000 limit through a single bank relationship. As Reuters has noted, IntraFi's services "rose in popularity during the 2008 financial crisis. Money is spread around in chunks across a network of 'well-capitalized' banks, with maturities of four weeks to five years." In some cases, however, the yields are lower than those on CDs and money market accounts.

References

Financial services companies of the United States